Finnfight or Scandinavian open NHB Championships (SNC) was an annual mixed martial arts competition in Turku, Finland. Contrary to most other mixed martial arts organizations and competitions, elbow strikes, knee strikes, and headbutts from any position were legal.

The first Finnfight event, FINNFIGHT 1, was held in 1998 at Rantasipi Hotelli (currently called Caribia Hotel), Turku, and featured fighters from Finland and Sweden.
 
FinnFight's last event, FinnFight 10, took place on December 6, 2008 and was the promotion's 10th event.

Rules
 (Translated extract from www.finnfightersgym.fi)
The fights took place in a ring or arena, which had a padded floor to increase the safety of the fighters. The bouts were 10 minutes long, with no round breaks. During the length of the bout, there was a referee in the competition area, who oversaw the rules. The referee had the right to stop the bout if necessary. The referee's decision was final. Protests led to the disqualification of the fighter.

Ways to win
 Knockout (KO)
 Submission (tapout, TO)
 Referee stoppage (TKO)
 Doctor stoppage (TKO)
 Cornerman stoppage (TKO)
 Disqualification for breaking the rules
 After the full bout time (10 minutes), three judges decide the winner (Criteria: stand-up, takedowns, ground techniques and fighting spirit)

Fouls
 Pushing fingers into the opponent's eyes, mouth, ears, or groin area. 
 Biting.
 Grabbing the ropes.
 Strikes to the throat.
 Kicks while wearing shoes (allowed shoes are boxing- or wrestling shoes).
 Usage of doping or illegal substances.
 Small joint manipulation.
 Stomping or soccer kicking the head of a downed opponent while the other fighter is still standing.
 Strikes to the groin.
 Throwing or pushing the opponent out of the competition area.
 Unsportsmanlike conduct.

Equipment and other information
 Grappling-model gloves are supplied by the competition hosts.
 Groin protection is compulsory.
 Mouthguard is compulsory.
 Wrestling- or boxing-shoes are allowed, but the fighter using shoes is not allowed to kick the opponent.
 The fighter can wear, for instance, a gi, wrestling outfit, or shorts.
 The fighter can also wear protective equipment according to their particular style (knee or leg pads).
 Application of any kinds of lubricative substances on any body part except the face is disallowed.
 The fighters are subject to a medical exam both before and after the bouts.

Weight divisions
Weigh-ins took place at the day of the competition (6h before).

Notable fighters
 Alexander Gustafsson        http://www.sherdog.com/fighter/Alexander-Gustafsson-26162
 Joachim Hansen (fighter)    http://www.sherdog.com/fighter/Joachim-Hansen-3177
 Jari Heiskanen                  http://www.sherdog.com/fighter/Jari-Heiskanen-4188
 Jon-Olav Einemo                 http://www.sherdog.com/fighter/John-Olav-Einemo-2873
 Tom Niinimäki                   http://www.sherdog.com/fighter/Tom-Niinimaki-5639
 David Bielkheden                http://www.sherdog.com/fighter/David-Bielkheden-3863
 Per Eklund                      http://www.sherdog.com/fighter/Per-Eklund-3707
 Tor Troeng                      http://www.sherdog.com/fighter/Tor-Troeng-6850
 Mikkel Guldbæk                  http://www.sherdog.com/fighter/Mikkel-Guldbaek-4311
 Assan Njie                      http://www.sherdog.com/fighter/Assan-Njie-6858
 Sauli Heilimö                   http://www.sherdog.com/fighter/Sauli-Heilimo-3709
 Jani Lax                        http://www.sherdog.com/fighter/Jani-Lax-2940
 Timo-Juhani Hirvikangas         http://www.sherdog.com/fighter/TimoJuhani-Hirvikangas-41510
 Ykä Leino                       http://www.sherdog.com/fighter/Yka-Leino-2943
 Mikko Suvanto                   http://www.sherdog.com/fighter/Mikko-Suvanto-13935
 Jacob Lovstad                   http://www.sherdog.com/fighter/Jakob-Lovstad-4922
 Toni Linden
 Blazej Sawinski
 Tyrone Washington
 Olof Inger
 Jason Fields
 Jarmo Haimakainen
 Derek Renquist
 Hans Ersson
 Peder Söderlind

References

 Finnfighters Gym. Scandinavian open NHB Championships. www.finnfightersgym.fi. URL last accessed February 2, 2006. (In Finnish)

External links
 Finnfight event results on Sherdog

Sport in Finland
Mixed martial arts organizations
History of Turku